NLRC5, short for NOD-like receptor family CARD domain containing 5, is an intracellular protein that plays a role in the immune system.  NLRC5 is a pattern recognition receptor implicated in innate immunity to viruses potentially by regulating interferon activity.

Recently, NLRC5 has been suggested to play a positive role in the regulation of Major Histocompatibility Class I (MHCI) molecule expression. This aspect of NLRC5 function was further investigated with the help of Nlrc5-deficient mice, which showed reduced MHCI expression in lymphocytes (particularly T, NK and NKT lymphocytes). In lymphocytes, NLRC5 localizes to the nucleus and drives MHCI gene expression by occupying H-2D and H-2K gene promoters.

In humans, the NLRC5 protein is encoded by the NLRC5 gene. It has also been called NOD27, NOD4, and CLR16.1.

References

LRR proteins
NOD-like receptors